The 1894 North Carolina Tar Heels football team represented the University of North Carolina in the 1894 college football season.  They played nine games with a final record of 6–3. The team captain for the 1894 season was Charles Baskerville.

Because Trinity (Duke) suspended play of intercollegiate football this season's contest was the last one until 1922.

Schedule

References

North Carolina
North Carolina Tar Heels football seasons
North Carolina Tar Heels football